The 2006 World Rally Championship was the 34th season in the FIA World Rally Championship. The season began on January 20 with the 74th Monte Carlo Rally where Finland's Marcus Grönholm, in a Ford Focus RS WRC, took the win ahead of France's Sébastien Loeb. After the Swedish Rally ended with the same top-two, Loeb and Kronos Citroën went on to win five rallies in a row. Despite an injury in a mountain-biking accident before the Rally of Turkey, forcing Loeb to miss last four rallies, he secured his third drivers' title, whereas Ford won their first manufacturers' title since 1979.

Rule changes
In an attempt to cut costs, new regulations required mechanical front and rear differentials, while the central differential remained active. Active suspension and water injections were also prohibited. Cars entered by a manufacturer had to be equipped with the same engine for two rallies; further limitations were imposed on the changing of some parts, including suspension, steering, turbochargers and gearboxes.

For 2006 manufacturer is understood to mean a manufacturer, a team designated by a manufacturer, or a privateer team taking part with a single make of car.

Two categories were created to compete for the Manufacturer's championship:

Manufacturer 1 (M1)
undertakes to take part in all the rallies of the Championship
must enter only cars corresponding to the latest homologated version of a World Rally Car in conformity with the 2006 Appendix J
must inform the FIA of the name of the first driver entered for the season at the time of registration for the Championship. No change of the first driver is authorised, except in a case of force majeure. The driver of the second car may be changed for each of the rallies in the Championship
In order to score points in the Championship, a Manufacturer 1 must take part with two cars of the same make in the 16 rallies of the calendar

Manufacturer 2 (M2)
undertakes to take part in 10 or more Championship rallies which it has nominated
cannot enter World Rally Cars homologated during the year 2006 and cannot use parts homologated after 2 January 2006
cannot enter a driver who has been classified among the first six in the final classification of the FIA World Rally Championship for Drivers in the last five years
In order to score points in the Championship, a Manufacturer 2 must take part with two cars of the same make in 10 or more rallies it nominated on registering for the Championship. The Manufacturer can only score points in the events it nominated on registering

Calendar

The 2006 championship was contested over sixteen rounds in Europe, North America, Asia, South America and Oceania.

Teams and drivers

Notes
This is the first season without Carlos Sainz since 1986.

† Sebastien Loeb broke his arm before Rally Turkey and missed the remainder of the season.

JWRC entries

PWRC entries

Results and standings

Drivers' championship

 Sébastien Loeb secured the drivers' championship title in Australia.

Manufacturers' championship

 Ford secured the manufacturers' championship in New Zealand.

JWRC Drivers' championship

PWRC Drivers' championship

Events

References

External links
 FIA World Rally Championship 2006 at ewrc-results.com

World Rally Championship seasons
World Rally Championship